The Ponte Alta River is a river of Goiás state in central Brazil.

References
Brazilian Ministry of Transport

See also
List of rivers of Goiás

Rivers of Federal District (Brazil)
Rivers of Goiás